Colonel John Walpole (17 November 1787 – 10 December 1859) was a soldier and diplomat, a younger son of Horatio Walpole, 2nd Earl of Orford.

He served with the Guards during the Peninsular War, and was wounded at the Siege of Burgos. He was Member of Parliament for King's Lynn from 1822 to 1831. Walpole served as private secretary to Lord Palmerston from November 1830 to August 1833, when he was appointed British Consul-General and Plenipotentiary at Santiago in Chile. Walpole was promoted to Chargé d'affaires in May 1841, and retired in March 1849.

References

1797 births
1859 deaths
Coldstream Guards officers
British Army personnel of the Napoleonic Wars
British diplomats
Members of the Parliament of the United Kingdom for English constituencies
UK MPs 1820–1826
UK MPs 1826–1830
Younger sons of earls
UK MPs 1830–1831
Principal Private Secretaries to the Secretary of State for Foreign and Commonwealth Affairs
John